The Royal Navy had a number of floating drydocks for the repair of warships where there was no fixed dry dock available. The docks did not receive a name and were known as "Admiralty Floating Dock" with a number. 
In size they went up to ones capable of lifting the largest Royal Navy battleships.

List

19th Century
Admiralty Floating Dock Bermuda - Royal Naval Dockyard, Ireland Island, Bermuda, moored in the camber of what was to become the North Yard of the dockyard when the South Yard was constructed at the turn of the Century. 1869-1906. It was intended to be scrapped by a German company, but this was prevented by the outbreak of the First World War and it remains across the mouth of the Great Sound at Spanish Point, crumbling away in the shallows of Stovell Bay.
Numbered docks
Admiralty Floating Dock No. 1 - Royal Naval Dockyard, Bermuda, 1902-1946. The largest floating drydock in the World, at the time, it was towed to Bermuda from Sheerness by two Dutch tugs (as no British tugs of sufficient power were available) in 1902. It was initially anchored off Agar's Island and Boss' Cove, at Spanish Point, Pembroke, pending completion of the new South Yard, its intended berth, at the Royal Naval Dockyard. Renamed from "Bermuda Dock" to AFD 1 in 1925. Clark & Standfield, 545 ft, 99 ft internal width with a lifting capacity of 11,700tons
Admiralty Floating Dock No. 2
Admiralty Floating Dock No. 3- Dover, 1912, designed to lift three submarines. 290 ft, 1600 tons
Admiralty Floating Dock No. 4 -  Medway, 680 ft, 32,000 tons lifting capacity
Admiralty Floating Dock No. 5 Royal Naval Dockyard, Bermuda, 1946-1951.
Admiralty Floating Dock No. 6 -Sheerness. built by Swan Hunter & Wigham Richardson 280 ft, 2000 tons. Intended for Harwich to lift two destroyers at a time, moved to Sheerness in 1920.
Admiralty Floating Dock No. 7
Admiralty Floating Dock No. 8 - Malta, reduced to hulk by 1948 and replaced by AFD No. 35 
Admiralty Floating Dock No. 9 - Singapore, also known as "Singapore Dock" or "Admiralty IX", 855 ft long, 55,000 tons capacity 
Admiralty Floating Dock No. 10
Admiralty Floating Dock No. 11 - Southampton, 960 ft; lifting capacity 60,000 tons. Built for Southern Railway. Taken over by Admiralty in 1939.
Admiralty Floating Dock No. 12 - At Rosyth, 380 ft,  2750 tons
Admiralty Floating Dock No. 13
Admiralty Floating Dock No. 14 - At Scapa Flow during WWII. Built by Palmers Hebburn, 240 ton lift, 142.5 ft 
Admiralty Floating Dock No. 15 - At Stornoway and Greenock during WWII. Built by Palmers Hebburn, 240 ton lift, 142.5 ft   
Admiralty Floating Dock No. 16 - At Lerwick and Invergordon during WWII. Built by Palmers Hebburn, 240 ton lift, 142.5 ft   
Admiralty Floating Dock No. 17 - Reykjavik. 2750 tons built at Devonport. Moved to Sydney in 1944 arriving in May 1945 
Admiralty Floating Dock No. 18 - Clark Stanfield design, lifting capacity of 2750 tons
Admiralty Floating Dock No. 19
Admiralty Floating Dock No. 20 - Port Bannatyne on the Isle of Bute. 2750 tons. Replacement for AFD7. Used for submarines including X-craft
Admiralty Floating Dock No. 21
Admiralty Floating Dock No. 22 - Clark Stanfield design built at Chatham, lifting capacity of 2750 tons, intended for the emergency docking of escort vessels and destroyers.
Admiralty Floating Dock No. 23
Admiralty Floating Dock No. 26 -Fabricated in Calcutta, assembled in Bombay 1944, Braithwaite B/j Ltd. Moved to Hafnarfjördur, Iceland 1995 is still in operation will be scrap 2021 - 2022
Admiralty Floating Dock No. 28 -Royal Naval Dockyard, Bermuda. 1941-1946.
Admiralty Floating Dock No. 35 -Malta. 1948 onwards.
Admiralty Floating Dock No. 48 -Royal Naval Dockyard, Bermuda. The smaller of two at Royal Naval Dockyard, Bermuda from 1946 (replacing a US lend-lease dock) until the dockyard was reduced to a base in 1951. Transferred to civil Government after 1951 and remained until 1972.
Admiralty Floating Dock No. 59 -Portsmouth, 1960 onwards.  long, for "destroyers, frigates and nuclear submarines"
Admiralty Floating Dock No. 60 - Faslane (now HMNB Clyde), 1965 onwards. Constructed in Portsmouth, operated at Faslane with a 6000 ton capacity for nuclear submarines. Moved to Hafnarfjördur Iceland 1997 is still in operation 
Admiralty Floating Dock No. 67 - 1945. Constructed from concrete. 800 ton capacity for service with RN Far East.

Notes

References

Auxiliary ships of the United Kingdom